This is a history of the progression of the World Record for the Swimming event: the 200 Freestyle. It is a listing of the fastest-time-ever swum in the event, in both long course (50m) and short course (25m) swimming pool. These records are maintained/recognized by FINA, which oversees international competitive swimming and Aquatics.

The drop in world record times in the 2008–2009 coincided with the introduction of polyurethane suits from Speedo (LZR, 50% polyurethane) in 2008 and by Arena (X-Glide), Adidas (Hydrofoil) and Italian swimming suit manufacturer Jaked (all 100% polyurethane) in 2009.  FINA's ban on non-textile suit came into effect in January 2010. FINA also release a list of approved suits.

The long course records are historically older than the short course records; the latter having only been recognized since the early 1990s.

Men

Long course

Short course

Women

Long course

Short course

All-time top 25

Men long course
Correct as of August 2022

Notes
Below is a list of other times equal or superior to 1:45.10:
Paul Biedermann also swam 1:42.81 (2009), 1:43.65 (2009), 1:44.02 (2009), 1:44.71 (2009), 1:44.88 (2009, 2011).
David Popovici also swam 1:43.21 (2022), 1:44.40 (2022), 1:44.68 (2021), 1:44.91 (2022).
Michael Phelps also swam 1:43.22 (2009), 1:43.31 (2008), 1:43.86 (2007), 1:44.10 (2008), 1:44.23 (2009), 1:44.49 (2009), 1:44.79 (2011), 1:44.98 (2007).
Yannick Agnel also swam 1:44.20 (2013), 1:44.42 (2012), 1:44.99 (2011).
Duncan Scott also swam 1:44.47 (2021), 1:44.60 (2021), 1:44.91 (2019), 1:45.02 (2022).
Sun Yang also swam 1:44.47 (2013), 1:44.63 (2016), 1:44.65 (2016), 1:44.82 (2016), 1:44.91 (2017), 1:44.93 (2012, 2019), 1:44.99 (2011).
Thomas Dean also swam 1:44.58 (2021), 1:44.98 (2022).
Hwang Sun-woo also swam 1:44.62 (2021), 1:44.67 (2022), 1:44.96 (2021).
Ian Thorpe also swam 1:44.69 (2001), 1:44.71 (2002, 2004), 1:44.75 (2002), 1:44.97 (2001), 1:45.07 (2004), 1:45.09 (2002).
Park Tae-hwan also swam 1:44.85 (2008), 1:44.92 (2011), 1:44.93 (2012), 1:45.01 (2016).
Danila Izotov also swam 1:44.87 (2013), 1:45.09 (2009).
Martin Malyutin also swam 1:45.01 (2021).
Ryan Lochte also swam 1:45.04 (2012).
Townley Haas also swam 1:45.04 (2017).
Fernando Scheffer also swam 1:45.05 (2021).
Danas Rapsys also swam 1:45.07 (2019).
Kieran Smith also swam 1:45.07 (2021).

Men short course
Correct as of December 2022

Notes
Below is a list of other times equal or superior to 1:41.32:
Paul Biedermann also swam 1:39.81 (2009), 1:40.83 (2008).
Duncan Scott also swam 1:40.76 (2020), 1:40.92 (2019).
Danila Izotov also swam 1:40.87 (2009).
Matthew Sates also swam 1:40.88 (2022), 1:41.33 (2021).
Danas Rapsys also swam 1:40.95 (2018), 1:41.12 (2019), 1:41.17 (2021), 1:41.23 (2020).
Kyle Chalmers also swam 1:40.98 (2022), 1:41.09 (2022).
Tom Dean also swam 1:40.98 (2022).
Hwang Sun-woo also swam 1:40.99 (2022), 1:41.17 (2021).
Ryan Lochte also swam 1:41.17 (2012).
Yannick Agnel also swam 1:41.26 (2013).

Women long course
Correct as of March 2023

Notes
Below is a list of other times equal or superior to 1:55.41:
Ariarne Titmus also swam 1:53.31 (2022), 1:53.50 (2021), 1:53.89 (2022), 1:54.27 (2019), 1:54.30 (2019), 1:54.51 (2021), 1:54.66 (2019, 2022), 1:54.82 (2021), 1:54.85 (2018), 1:55.09 (2019), 1:55.27 (2018), 1:55.36 (2019).
Federica Pellegrini also swam 1:53.67 (2009), 1:54.22 (2019), 1:54.47 (2009), 1:54.55 (2016), 1:54.73 (2017), 1:54.82 (2008), 1:55.00 (2015), 1:55.14 (2013, 2019), 1:55.18 (2016), 1:55.30 (2016), 1:55.32 (2015).
Sarah Sjöström also swam 1:54.31 (2015), 1:54.34 (2016), 1:54.65 (2016), 1:54.77 (2015), 1:54.78 (2019), 1:54.87 (2016), 1:55.04 (2014), 1:55.05 (2015), 1:55.14 (2019), 1:55.23 (2012), 1:55.30 (2016), 1:55.39 (2019).
Katie Ledecky also swam 1:54.40 (2021), 1:54.43 (2016), 1:54.50 (2022), 1:54.56 (2018), 1:54.59 (2020), 1:54.60 (2018), 1:54.66 (2022), 1:54.69 (2017), 1:54.81 (2016), 1:54.82 (2016), 1:54.84 (2017), 1:54.85 (2016), 1:54.88 (2016), 1:54.96 (2023), 1:55.01 (2016), 1:55.10 (2016), 1:55.11 (2021), 1:55.15 (2018, 2022), 1:55.16 (2014, 2015, 2018), 1:55.18 (2017), 1:55.21 (2021), 1:55.28 (2021), 1:55.32 (2018), 1:55.34 (2017, 2021), 1:55.37 (2015), 1:55.40 (2021).
Allison Schmitt also swam 1:54.40 (2012), 1:54.96 (2009), 1:55.04 (2012).
Yang Junxuan also swam 1:54.48 (2021), 1:54.57 (2021), 1:54.70 (2021), 1:54.92 (2022), 1:54.98 (2020), 1:55.01 (2021).
Emma McKeon also swam 1:54.74 (2021), 1:54.83 (2016), 1:54.92 (2016), 1:54.99 (2017), 1:55.18 (2017).
Summer McIntosh also swam 1:54.79 (2022), 1:55.04 (2023), 1:55.24 (2022), 1:55.39 (2022).
Taylor Ruck also swam 1:54.81 (2018).
Camille Muffat also swam 1:54.87 (2012), 1:55.21 (2012), 1:55.40 (2012).
Siobhan Haughey also swam 1:54.89 (2021), 1:54.98 (2019), 1:55.16 (2021), 1:55.21 (2020).
Mollie O'Callaghan also swam 1:54.94 (2022), 1:55.11 (2021), 1:55.22 (2022), 1:55.27 (2023).
Rikako Ikee also swam 1:55.04 (2018).
Missy Franklin also swam 1:55.06 (2011).
Femke Heemskerk also swam 1:55.22 (2015), 1:55.35 (2014).
Veronika Andrusenko also swam 1:55.26 (2017).
Penny Oleksiak also swam 1:55.38 (2021).

Women short course
Correct as of December 2022

Notes
Below is a list of other times equal or superior to 1:52.59:
Siobhan Haughey also swam 1:50.65 (2021), 1:50.66 (2021), 1:51.04 (2021), 1:51.11 (2020), 1:51.13 (2022), 1:51.17 (2021), 1:51.19 (2020, 2022), 1:51.36 (2020, 2022), 1:51.42 (2020), 1:51.67 (2020), 1:51.88 (2020), 1:51.99 (2019), 1:52.25 (2021), 1:52.50 (2021).
Sarah Sjöström also swam 1:50.78 (2014), 1:51.44 (2014), 1:51.56 (2017), 1:51.60 (2017), 1:51.63 (2017), 1:51.77 (2017), 1:51.92 (2018), 1:52.00 (2017), 1:52.25 (2018), 1:52.26 (2013), 1:52.35 (2018), 1:52.58 (2011).
Katinka Hosszú also swam 1:51.41 (2014), 1:51.44 (2014), 1:51.50 (2014), 1:51.84 (2014), 1:52.08 (2016), 1:52.25 (2014), 1:52.28 (2016), 1:52.32 (2013), 1:52.45 (2014), 1:52.55 (2014)).
Federica Pellegrini also swam 1:51.63 (2017), 1:51.73 (2016), 1:51.85 (2008), 1:51.89 (2015), 1:52.05 (2017), 1:52.33 (2009).
Femke Heemskerk also swam 1:51.72 (2014), 1:51.91 (2018), 1:52.04 (2018), 1:52.22 (2018), 1:52.23 (2017), 1:52.24 (2017, 2020), 1:52.25 (2013), 1:52.36 (2018), 1:52.42 (2010, 2017), 1:52.46 (2014), 1:52.53 (2015), 1:52.54 (2014), 1:52.57 (2018).
Emma McKeon also swam 1:51.83 (2020), 1:52.40 (2013), 1:52.49 (2015), 1:52.59 (2014).
Allison Schmitt also swam 1:52.08 (2011), 1:52.17 (2020).
Camille Muffat also swam 1:52.20 (2012), 1:52.28 (2012), 1:52.29 (2010).
Ariarne Titmus also swam 1:52.22 (2018).
Katie Ledecky also swam 1:52.31 (2022).
Charlotte Bonnet also swam 1:52.36 (2018).
Mallory Comerford also swam 1:52.52 (2018).
Madison Wilson also swam 1:52.55 (2022).

References

Freestyle 0200 metres
World record progression 0200 metres freestyle